Lavau is the name or part of the name of the following communes in France:

Lavau, Aube, in the Aube department
Lavau, Yonne, in the Yonne department
Lavau-sur-Loire, in the Loire-Atlantique department